Mawlānā (from Arabic, also spelled as maulana or molana (Urdu, from Arabic mawlānā), is a title, mostly in Central Asia and in the Indian subcontinent, preceding the name of respected Muslim religious leaders, in particular graduates of religious institutions, e.g. a madrassa or a darul uloom, or scholars who have studied under other Islamic scholars.

Other uses 
Although the word is derived from the Arabic word mawla, it adopted different meanings as it travelled from Arabia to Persia, Turkey, Africa and the Indian subcontinent.

Persian use 
In Iran and Turkey the word normally refers to Rumi (Persian pronunciation Mowlana) (Turkish pronunciation Mevlana).

Indian Use 
In Indian countries like India, Pakistan, Bangladesh in different Muslim languages like Urdu, Sylheti,  Bangla. Mawlana (মাওলানা) in Bangla and Molana (ꠝꠟꠣꠘꠣ/مولانا) in Urdu & Sylheti presents the leaders or scholars of Islam. Also presents Religious School Teachers.

Africa 
This word has been borrowed into the Swahili language, where it is used also as a title of respect for revered members of a community, religious or secular, roughly equivalent to the English "Sir". 

In the mostly Muslim region of West Africa, the root has been proposed as a source for the words Mallam (Hausa language) and Maame (Wolof language), which are used to denote Islamic scholars, or in areas practising folk Islam or folk magic, a local shaman. Among the Hausas the word Mallam is additionally used as equivalent of English Mr. A more likely explanation for this word (and for the Swahili mwalimu) is the Arabic word mu'allim, which in Moroccan Arabic is pronounced "m'allam" and means ‘teacher’ or ‘master’ in a Qur'anic school.

Difference in titles Mullah and Maulvi among Muslims in South Asia 
In the Central Asian and South Asian / Indian subcontinent context, where "Mullah" does not carry a formal sense, Maulana is often the word of choice for addressing or referring to Muslim religious scholars that are respected, while Mullah is used often derogatorily for people the speaker considers to be more rabble-rousers than scholars.

Although the words Maulvi and Maulana are interchanged in the Indian Subcontinent as a title of respect, Maulana is more often associated with formal qualification following study at a madrassa or darul uloom and Maulvi is usually more a general title for religious figures. In Bangladesh, in the government Aliyah madrassa system, Maulvi is also associated with formal degrees for those who have passed the course of Maulvi (basic), Maulvi Alim (intermediate) or Maulvi Fazil (advanced).

See also
Glossary of Islam
Marabout, West African religious teachers
Mawlawi
Mullah
Sheikh

References

Arabic words and phrases
Islamic honorifics
Religious leadership roles